WHKZ (1440 AM) is a non-commercial radio station licensed to Warren, Ohio, featuring a Catholic–based Christian format as an owned-and-operated station in the Relevant Radio network. The station serves both Sharon, Pennsylvania, and Youngstown, Ohio. WHKZ's transmitter resides on Calson-Salt Springs Road in Warren, operating at a continuous power of 5,000 watts; the directional antenna pattern uses two towers during the day, and six towers at night.

History
The station originally signed on November 11, 1941, at 250 watts on 1400 kHz., as WRRN, the call letters being a contraction of "Warren." In 1946, the power was increased to 5000 watts and the frequency got changed to 1440 kHz. In 1948, it was purchased by Helen Hart Hurlburt, publisher of the Tribune-Chronicle, and the call sign was changed to WHHH, to reflect her initials.  Under her ownership, a construction permit was obtained for a television station, WHHH-TV on channel 67 in the early 1950s, but the station never made it onto the air, probably because of the vagaries of operating a UHF station at the time.

Hurlburt sold the station to Warren Broadcasting Co. headed by Frank Mangano of East Liverpool, Ohio in 1981, and the call letters were changed to WRRO (for "Warren, Ohio") on May 4, 1981. The format at that time became Rock Oldies.

The station was subsequently purchased in February 1996 by Star Communications, Inc., headed by Art Greenberg and Phil Levine of Cleveland. Under Star Communications, WRRO flipped to a sports talk format. Dan McDowell, Dave Denholm, Daryl Ruiter and Eric Boland are some of the personalities to grace the airwaves during this time.

The call sign was changed to WRBP on September 25, 1998 (calls that were warehoused from the 101.9 facility in Hubbard, Ohio after that station was leased out by then-owner Stop 26/Riverbend to Jacor/Clear Channel, and operated it as WBTJ).

Star Communications sold the station to Salem Communications in early 2001, and the calls were changed to WHKW on March 15, 2001. The new call letters where adapted from the calls of WHK in Cleveland which Salem had purchased five years earlier, with the second "W" either standing for Warren or for WHK's "The Word" slogan.

It operated briefly as WFHM from July 6 to August 16, 2001, when Salem parked the WFHM call letters here while operating its newly obtained FM station in Cleveland as WHK-FM, then changed back to WHKW.  When Salem Communications moved the WHKW calls to Cleveland for its station on 1220 kHz (due to the WHK callsign moving back to its original home of 1420 kHz) the call letters of the Warren station were changed to WHKZ on April 13, 2005. Programming on WHKZ was supplied mostly by the Salem Radio Network, with the bulk of the schedule simulcast from WHKW in Cleveland, in addition to running Warren native Hugh Hewitt's talk show in the early evening hours.

In February 2008, an agreement was reached for Pittsburgh's Pentecostal Temple Church to acquire WHKZ for a reported sale price of $550,000 and was eventually approved by the FCC, but eventually fell through. The station remained owned and operated by Salem Communications until August 15, 2019, when WHKZ and the construction permit for its forthcoming FM translator was included in a multi-station purchase by Immaculate Heart Media, Inc. valued at $8,732,125; it became an owned and operated station of the Relevant Radio network upon the deal's closing.

The sale closed on November 14, and WHKZ switched programming to the Relevant Radio network.

References

External links

HKZ
HKZ
Warren, Ohio
Relevant Radio stations
Radio stations established in 1941
1941 establishments in Ohio